Ha Dae-won (하대원; born April 28, 1985) is a South Korean football player who is former player of Barito Putera since 2013 to 2014 in the Indonesia Super League.

Career 
In January 2015, he joined Bali United. He is out from Sime Darby F.C. in November 2016.

References

1985 births
Living people
South Korean footballers
South Korean expatriate footballers
South Korean expatriate sportspeople in Indonesia
Expatriate footballers in Indonesia
Liga 1 (Indonesia) players
PS Barito Putera players
Bali United F.C. players
Association football defenders
Footballers from Seoul